Shengsi may refer to:

Shengsi County, in Zhejiang, China
Shengsi Islands, in Zhoushan, Zhejiang, China